Kristin Louise Topham (born April 5, 1973) is a Canadian former competitive swimmer who represented Canada in international championship competitions in the late 1980s and early 1990s.

Topham is best remembered for her four-medal performance at the 1991 Pan American Games in Havana, Cuba.  In individual sprint event, she won two gold medals in the 50-metre freestyle and the 100-metre butterfly, as well as a bronze in the 100-metre freestyle.  As a member of Canada's second-place women's team in the 4x100-metre freestyle relay, she also earned a silver medal.

Topham also represented Canada twice in the Olympic Games.  At her international debut as a 15-year-old at the 1988 Summer Olympics in Seoul, South Korea, she competed in two events, advancing to the B Final of the 50-metre freestyle and placing twelfth overall, as well as swimming for the Canadian team in the preliminary heats of the 4x100-metre freestyle relay.

When she won two golds at the 1991 Pan American Games, the Toronto Star listed her a Mississaugan.

Four years later at the 1992 Summer Olympics in Barcelona, Spain, she qualified for three events.  Topham was a member of the sixth-place Canadian women's team in the 4x100-metre medley relay.  In individual competition, she advanced to the B Finals of the 50-mtre freestyle and the 100-metre butterfly, placing tenth and fourteenth, respectively.

References

External links
 Canadian Olympic Committee

1973 births
Living people
Canadian female butterfly swimmers
Canadian female freestyle swimmers
Olympic swimmers of Canada
Swimmers from Edmonton
Swimmers from Mississauga
Swimmers at the 1988 Summer Olympics
Swimmers at the 1991 Pan American Games
Swimmers at the 1992 Summer Olympics
Pan American Games gold medalists for Canada
Pan American Games silver medalists for Canada
Pan American Games bronze medalists for Canada
Pan American Games medalists in swimming
Medalists at the 1991 Pan American Games
20th-century Canadian women